Kadus is a village in Khed taluka in Pune district of state of Maharashtra, India.

Religion
Though majority of the population in the village is Hindu Maratha. Number of schedule caste population are residing there from the British period. Nehere Patil, Bandawane Patil, Argade Patil, Panmand, Musale, Dhamale, Dhaybar, Gargote, Shelake, Pote are the most dominated surname at that region. Famous in all tahsil for "Bara wadya and terave kadus".

Economy
The majority of the population is dependent on agriculture.

Educational 
the maximum people are well educated
most of people are now working in pune and pimpri cinchwad industrial area.

Special
Bhairavnath Religious Festival (Yatra) is held every year in the month of Kartik (Oct/Nov) and pilgrims around the neighborhood gather in great numbers. Bhima river is near to this place. 
There is one more Ustav celebrates for Shree Pandurang which is in Magh Shudha Dashami to Magh Shudh Pournima. This Ustav celebrates for 369 years which had started by Shree Sant Shiromani Tukaram Maharaj. This event start as request of gangaji maval maharaj, The Gangaji Maval Maharaj is one talkari between 15 talkari of Tukaram Maharaj. When Tukaram Maharj Goes to vaikunth that time he says his everyone talkari to ask his last wish, then Gangaji Maval Maharaj says "Mazi ekach echya ahe ki dev pandurang mazya gaval 5 divas ala pahije" then from this days this event is start.

Production
This village mainly produces onion & jowar leading producer in Khed Taluka.

See also
 Khed taluka

References 

Villages in Pune district